Patrick Kavanagh (22 June 1919 – 1 March 1993) was an Irish footballer of the 1940s, who played for the 1948 Irish Olympic team when they were knocked out of the 1948 Olympics by the Netherlands.

References

External links

 Paddy Kavanagh at Sports Reference

Republic of Ireland association footballers
Bohemian F.C. players
Footballers at the 1948 Summer Olympics
Olympic footballers of Ireland
1919 births
1993 deaths
Association football midfielders